The Art Carney Special is a comedy television series starting Art Carney as Axel Heist that aired on NBC from 1959 until 1961. The show earned the Primetime Emmy Award for Outstanding Comedy Series (then known as Outstanding Program Achievement in the Field of Humor) at the 12th Primetime Emmy Awards.

Notes

External links
 

1959 American television series debuts
1961 American television series endings
1950s American comedy television series
1960s American comedy television series

English-language television shows
NBC original programming
Primetime Emmy Award for Outstanding Comedy Series winners